Proentelodon is an extinct genus of entelodont artiodactyl from the Middle Eocene of Mongolia. P. minutus is the oldest representative of the family Entelodontidae, P. minutus gen. et sp. nov, is described from the Middle Eocene Khaichin Ula II Fauna in Mongolia.

References

Entelodonts
Eocene even-toed ungulates
Fossils of Mongolia
Fossil taxa described in 2008
Prehistoric even-toed ungulate genera